Aladiškės is a village in Varėna district municipality, in Alytus County, in southeastern Lithuania. According to the 2001 census, the village has a population of 11 people.

References

Villages in Varėna District Municipality